The 2015–16 Boston Pride season was the first in franchise history and participated in the National Women's Hockey League's inaugural season.

Regular season
 October 11: Hilary Knight would score the first goal in Pride franchise history at the 12:08 mark of the first period. Said goal was scored against Buffalo Beauts goaltender Brianne McLaughlin. Knight would score again in the second period, becoming the first player in NWHL history to log a multi-goal game. Kacey Bellamy would earn two assists, becoming the first blueliner in NWHL history to log a multi-point game.
 December 27: With several members of the Boston Pride honoring commitments with the US national team over the 2015 holiday season, general manager Hayley Moore would suit up in a game as an emergency player as the Pride skated against the Connecticut Whale. Moore would participate in 1 faceoff in a 2–1 final for the Pride as the Whale endured their first loss in franchise history.

Standings

Game log

|-  style="background:#cfc;"
| 1 || Oct 11 || @ Buffalo Beauts || 4–1 || || Ott || HarborCenter || 1–0–0 || 2 || 
|-  style="background:#cfc;"
| 2 || Oct 18 || @ New York Riveters || 7–1 || || Ott || Aviator Sports and Events Center || 2–0–0 || 4 || 
|-  style="background:#cfc;"
| 3 || Oct 25 || @ Buffalo Beauts || 5–3 || || Ott || HarborCenter || 3–0–0 || 6 || 
|-  style="background:#fcc;"
| 4 || Nov 15 || @ New York Riveters || 2–3 || || Slebodnick || Aviator Sports and Events Center || 3–1–0 || 6 || 
|-  style="background:#fcc;"
| 5 || Nov 22 || New York Riveters || 2–3 || || Ott || Bright Hockey Center || 3–2–0 || 6 || 
|-  style="background:#fcc;"
| 6 || Nov 29 || Connecticut Whale || 3–4 || || Slebodnick || Bright Hockey Center || 3–3–0 || 6 || 
|-  style="background:#cfc;"
| 7 || Dec 5 || Buffalo Beauts || 7–6 || || Slebodnick || Bright Hockey Center || 4–3–0 || 8 || 
|-  style="background:#cfc;"
| 8 || Dec 6 || New York Riveters || 4–1 || || Ott || Bright Hockey Center || 5–3–0 || 10 || 
|-  style="background:#cfc;"
| 9 || Dec 20 || Buffalo Beauts || 1–0 || || Ott || Bright Hockey Center || 6–3–0 || 12 || 
|-  style="background:#cfc;"
| 10 || Dec 27 || Connecticut Whale || 2–1 || || Ott || Chelsea Piers || 7–3–0 || 14 || 
|-  style="background:#fff;"
| 11 || Jan 3 || Buffalo Beauts || 3–4 || OT || Ott || Bright Hockey Center || 7–3–1 || 15 || 
|-  style="background:#cfc;"
| 12 || Jan 10 || New York Riveters || 8–1 || || Ott || Bright Hockey Center || 8–3–1 || 17 || 
|-  style="background:#cfc;"
| 13 || Jan 17 || Connecticut Whale || 4–1 || || Ott || Bright Hockey Center || 9–3–1 || 19 || 
|-  style="background:#cfc;"
| 14 || Jan 31 || Connecticut Whale || 5–2 || || Ott || Chelsea Piers || 10–3–1 || 21 || 
|-  style="background:#cfc;"
| 15 || Feb 6 || New York Riveters || 6–1 || || Ott || Aviator Sports and Events Center || 11–3–1 || 23 || 
|-  style="background:#cfc;"
| 16 || Feb 14 || Connecticut Whale || 4–2 || || Ott || Bright Hockey Center || 12–3–1 || 25 || 
|-  style="background:#cfc;"
| 17 || Feb 21 || Connecticut Whale || 5–3 || || Ott || Chelsea Piers || 13–3–1 || 27 || 
|-  style="background:#cfc;"
| 18 || Feb 28 || Buffalo Beauts || 3–2 || || Ott || HarborCenter || 14–3–1 || 29 || 
|-

|- style="text-align:center;"
|

Playoffs

Game log

|-  style="background:#cfc;"
| 1 || Mar 4 || New York Riveters || 6–0 || || Ott || Raymond Bourque Arena || 1–0 || 
|-  style="background:#cfc;"
| 2 || Mar 5 || New York Riveters || 7–4 || || Ott || Raymond Bourque Arena || 2–0 || 
|-

|-  style="background:#cfc;"
| 1 || Mar 11 || Buffalo Beauts || 4–3 || OT || Ott || Prudential Center Practice Facility || 1–0 || 
|-  style="background:#cfc;"
| 2 || Mar 12 || Buffalo Beauts || 3–1 || || Ott || Prudential Center Practice Facility || 2–0 || 
|-

|- 
|

Statistics
Final

Skaters

Goaltenders

Roster

|}

Awards and honors

NWHL Player of the Week
 Zoe Hickel – October 18, 2015
 Brianna Decker – October 25, 2015
 Jillian Dempsey – December 8, 2015
 Hilary Knight – December 22, 2015
 Jordan Smelker – February 14, 2016
 Brianna Decker – February 21, 2016
 Brittany Ott – February 28, 2016 

NWHL 1st All-Star Game selection
Kacey Bellamy (Team Knight)
Blake Bolden (Team Pfalzer)
Brianna Decker (Team Pfalzer)
Emily Field (Team Pfalzer)
Alyssa Gagliardi (Team Knight)
Zoe Hickel (Team Pfalzer)
Hilary Knight (Team Knight)
Gigi Marvin (Team Pfalzer)
Brittany Ott (Team Pfalzer)
Amanda Pelkey (Team Knight)
Jordan Smelker (Team Knight)

Regular season awards
 Hilary Knight – Leading Scorer
 Denna Laing – NWHL Foundation Award (Awarded to the player most actively applying the core values of hockey to her community as well as growing and improving hockey culture.)
 Gigi Marvin – NWHL Best Defenseman
 Brittany Ott – NWHL Best Goaltender
 Denna Laing – Perseverance Award (Awarded to the player who most exemplifies the qualities of perseverance, sportsmanship, and dedication to her sport.)
 Brianna Decker – NWHL MVP

Transactions

Signings

Draft

The following were the Pride selections in the 2015 NWHL Draft on June 20, 2015.

References

Games

Boston Pride
2015–16 NWHL season by team
Boston Pride
Boston Pride